Cribrospora is a genus of fungus in the order Agaricales. It is incertae sedis with respect to familial placement within the order. The genus is monotypic, containing the single species Cribrospora tulostomoides, found in Europe.

References

Agaricales enigmatic taxa
Fungi of Europe
Monotypic Agaricales genera
Taxa described in 2000
Secotioid fungi